Adriana tomentosa (common name - Mallee bitterbush) is a species of plant in the Euphorbiaceae family and is endemic to mainland Australia. 

It was first described by Charles Gaudichaud-Beaupré in 1825.

Description 
Adriana tomentosa is a shrub to about 2 m high. Male and female flowers are on separate plants.

Gallery

References

Acalypheae
Malpighiales of Australia
Flora of South Australia
Rosids of Western Australia
Flora of Victoria (Australia)
Flora of Western Australia
Plants described in 1825
Taxa named by Charles Gaudichaud-Beaupré
Endemic flora of Australia
Flora of the Northern Territory